Silly Billies is a 1936 American comedy film directed by Fred Guiol from a screenplay by Al Boasberg and Jack Townley, based on a story by Guiol and Thomas Lennon. The film was the twentieth feature for the comedy duo of Wheeler and Woolsey (Bert Wheeler and Robert Woolsey), and also stars Dorothy Lee, who had been in a number of their films. It was released by RKO Radio Pictures on March 20, 1936.

Premise
In 1851, dentists Roy Banks (Wheeler) and Philip "Painless" Pennington (Woolsey) attempt to save a town from being led into an Indian ambush.

Cast
Bert Wheeler as Roy Banks
Robert Woolsey as Dr. Philip "Painless" Pennington
Dorothy Lee as Mary Blake
Harry Woods as Hank Bewley
Ethan Laidlaw as Trigger
Chief Thunderbird as Chief Cyclone
Delmar Watson as Martin
Richard Alexander as John Little
Willie Best as Excitement
Jerry Tucker as Boy at Camp (uncredited)

References

1936 comedy films
1936 films
American comedy films
RKO Pictures films
American black-and-white films
Films directed by Fred Guiol
1930s American films